Local elections in Tacloban City, Leyte were held on May 9, 2016 within the Philippine general election. The voters elected candidates for the elective local posts in the city: the mayor, vice mayor, and ten councilors.

106,480 voters participated in this election out of 124,777 total registered voters. The city's voter turnout is 85.34%.

Background
Tacloban City Mayor Alfred Romualdez was on his third and final term as Mayor. His wife Cristina, currently a city councilor, ran for mayor under the Nacionalista Party. On October 16, 2015, she filed her COC for Mayor.  She was opposed by incumbent councilor Neil Glova.

The incumbent vice mayor, Jerry "Sambo" Yaokasin, ran as independent.  He was opposed by Ramon Tolibas, Jr. from the National Unity Party.

The number of candidates for this election is less than half than the number of candidates for the 2013 election. Some potential candidates did not have enough campaign funds due to the impact of Super Typhoon Yolanda in the city.

Results
The candidates for mayor and vice mayor with the highest number of votes wins the seat; they are voted separately, therefore, they may be of different parties when elected.

Mayoral Election
Parties are as stated in their certificate of candidacies.

Vice Mayoral Election
Parties are as stated in their certificate of candidacies. Jerry Yaokasin is the incumbent.

City Council Election
Voters elected ten councilors to comprise the City Council or the Sangguniang Panlungsod. Candidates are voted for separately so winning candidates may come from different political parties. The ten candidates with the highest number of votes win the seats. For the tickets, names that are italicized were incumbents seeking reelection.

I Love Tacloban - Unity Team

#TeamTaclobanon Ticket

 

|-bgcolor=black
|colspan=5|

References

External links
 Official website of the Commission on Elections
  Official website of National Movement for Free Elections (NAMFREL)
 Official website of the Parish Pastoral Council for Responsible Voting (PPCRV)

2016 Philippine local elections
Elections in Leyte (province)
Tacloban